Veterans Memorial Stadium is the name of several different facilities, mostly located in the United States:

 Veterans Memorial Stadium (Cedar Rapids), Iowa
 Veterans Memorial Stadium (Pago Pago), American Samoa
 Veterans Memorial Stadium (Long Beach), California
 Veterans Memorial Stadium (Quincy), Massachusetts
 Veterans Memorial Stadium (La Crosse), Wisconsin
 Veterans Memorial Stadium (Lawrence), Massachusetts
 Veterans Memorial Stadium (Troy University), Alabama
 Veterans Memorial Stadium (League City), Texas
 Veterans Memorial Stadium (Erie), Pennsylvania

See also 
 Memorial Stadium (disambiguation)
 Mississippi Veterans Memorial Stadium, Jackson, Mississippi
  Pasadena Veterans Memorial Stadium, Pasadena, Texas
 Veterans Stadium, Philadelphia, Pennsylvania
 Veterans Stadium (New Britain, Connecticut)